Mathieu Choinière (born February 7, 1999) is a Canadian soccer player who currently plays for CF Montréal in Major League Soccer.

Early life
Choinière was born in Saint-Jean-sur-Richelieu, Quebec and grew up in the neighbouring Saint-Alexandre, Quebec. He began playing soccer with Celtix du Haut-Richelieu, before moving on to CS St-Hubert. In 2011, he joined the Montreal Impact Academy and became the first player in the organization's history to play for the U13, U14, U16, U18 and U19 teams prior to joining the first team.

Club career

Montreal Impact / CF Montréal 
Choinière signed an MLS contract with the Montreal Impact, later renamed CF Montréal, on July 17, 2018. He made his first appearance the next day against the Vancouver Whitecaps FC in the Canadian Championship. He made his first league appearance 3 days later against the Portland Timbers. Choinière would have his option for the 2020 season exercised by the Impact, keeping him with the club. In February 2022 Choinière signed a contract extension through 2024, with an option year for 2025.

International career

Youth
Choinière has been called up to various youth camps for Canada. In 2017, he was called up to a Quebec-Canada U20 team to play friendlies against Haiti U20, who were preparing for the 2017 Jeux de la Francophonie.

In May 2018, he was called up to the Canada U21 team for the 2018 Toulon Tournament. He scored a goal against France in the fifth-place playoff. In October 2018 Choinière was named to the Canadian Under-20 squad for the 2018 CONCACAF U-20 Championship. He scored in Canada's second game of the tournament against Guadeloupe.

Choinière was named to the Canadian U-23 provisional roster for the 2020 CONCACAF Men's Olympic Qualifying Championship on February 26, 2020.

Senior
In November 2022 Choinière was called up to the senior side for a friendly against Bahrain.

Career statistics

Club

Honours

Club

Montreal Impact
 Canadian Championship: 2019, 2021

Notes

References 

1999 births
Living people
Association football forwards
Canadian soccer players
Canada men's youth international soccer players
Major League Soccer players
CF Montréal players
People from Saint-Jean-sur-Richelieu
Soccer people from Quebec
Homegrown Players (MLS)
Canada men's under-23 international soccer players
Celtix du Haut-Richelieu players